Zlatiya Glacier is the 6.7 km long and 3 km wide glacier on Brabant Island in the Palmer Archipelago, Antarctica situated north of Rush Glacier and west of upper Hippocrates Glacier.  It drains west-southwestwards from Aluzore Gap, flows between Mount Sarnegor and Veles Bastion, and enters Dallmann Bay north of Sidell Spur and south of Fleming Point.

The glacier is named after the settlements of Zlatiya in Northwestern and Northeastern Bulgaria.

Location
British mapping in 1980 and 2008.

See also
 List of glaciers in the Antarctic
 Glaciology

Maps
 Antarctic Digital Database (ADD). Scale 1:250000 topographic map of Antarctica. Scientific Committee on Antarctic Research (SCAR). Since 1993, regularly upgraded and updated.
British Antarctic Territory. Scale 1:200000 topographic map. DOS 610 Series, Sheet W 64 62. Directorate of Overseas Surveys, Tolworth, UK, 1980.
Brabant Island to Argentine Islands. Scale 1:250000 topographic map. British Antarctic Survey, 2008.

References
 Bulgarian Antarctic Gazetteer. Antarctic Place-names Commission. (details in Bulgarian, basic data in English)
 Zlatiya Glacier SCAR Composite Antarctic Gazetteer

External links
 Zlatiya Glacier. Copernix satellite image

Glaciers of the Palmer Archipelago
Bulgaria and the Antarctic
Brabant Island